Marcus Carver (born 22 October 1993) is a professional footballer who plays as a forward for Scunthorpe United.

Career
Carver was born in Blackburn, Lancashire, England. He joined Accrington Stanley in May 2010, signing a two-year apprenticeship. In April 2012, Carver signed his first professional contract. He made his professional debut for Stanley on 28 April, coming on as a substitute for Charlie Barnett in a 5–1 defeat to Bristol Rovers.

On 15 August 2012, he agreed to join Marine on a one-month loan deal. The loan deal was extended by a further two months after Carver scored 9 goals in his first 13 games for the club. On 6 December 2013 he joined Northern Premier League Premier Division side AFC Fylde on a month's loan, with the option to extend the loan based on performances for the Coasters. 

After leaving Accrington in June 2016, Carver signed for Chorley with whom he had previously played for on loan. Carver won promotion to the National League in his second season with the club. Carver left Chorley in May 2020 to sign for Southport.

After scoring 12 goals in 17 games for National League North side Southport, Carver signed for League Two club Hartlepool United for an undisclosed fee on 10 January 2022. On 15 January 2022, Carver made his Hartlepool debut in a 2–0 defeat to Bristol Rovers. Carver struggled to find form at Hartlepool; he played 17 times for the club in all competitions and failed to score. On 2 August 2022, Carver signed for National League club Scunthorpe United for an undisclosed fee. On 22 September 2022, Carver was sent out on a two-month loan deal to Southport.

Career statistics

References

External links

1993 births
Living people
English footballers
Footballers from Blackburn
Association football forwards
Accrington Stanley F.C. players
Marine F.C. players
FC Halifax Town players
Barrow A.F.C. players
AFC Fylde players
Chorley F.C. players
Southport F.C. players
Hartlepool United F.C. players
Scunthorpe United F.C. players
English Football League players
National League (English football) players
Northern Premier League players